Heinz Kurt Bolender (21 May 1912 – 10 October 1966) was an SS sergeant during the Nazi era. In 1942, he operated the gas chambers at Sobibór extermination camp, perpetrating acts of genocide against Jews and Romani people during Operation Reinhard. After the war, Bolender was recognized in 1961 while working under a false identity as a doorman at a nightclub in West Germany, and subsequently accused in 1965 of personally murdering at least 360 Jewish inmates and assisting in the murder of 86,000 more at Sobibór. He committed suicide in prison two months prior to the end of the trial.

Biography
Bolender was born in 1912 in Duisburg and stayed in school until the age of 16 when he became a blacksmith apprentice.  He joined the NSDAP in 1930.      
In 1939, he joined the SS-Totenkopfverbände ("Death's Head Unit"). He was attached to the Action T4 euthanasia program and worked at Hartheim, Hadamar, Brandenburg and Sonnenstein killing centers where physically and mentally disabled Germans were exterminated by gassing and lethal injection. Bolender was involved in the cremation process of disposing of victims, as well as "test" gassing procedures during the Action T4.  During this period he worked with Franz Stangl and Christian Wirth. In 1941-42 he was attached to an ambulance unit on the Eastern Front in Russia along with the other T-4 workers.

Sobibór extermination camp

Bolender served at Sobibor extermination camp from April to August 1942, where he was one of the most feared SS officers.<ref name=Klee2>Klee, Ernst: Das Personenlexikon zum Dritten Reich. Wer war was vor und nach 1945?'</ref> He was the commander of Sobibor's extermination area and he personally supervised gassings and cremations. He was entrusted with this job due to his prior working relationship with Sobibor commandant Franz Stangl.SS-Scharführer Erich Fuchs, who served with Bolender, testified about him in 1966:

Part of Bolender's duties included supervision of the Jewish work details in Lager III.  In his own words:SS-Oberscharführer Erich Bauer, who also served with Bolender at Sobibór, testified about him in 1966: Also, according to Bauer, Bolender participated in gang rapes of female prisoners prior to killing them:

In 1965, Ada Lichtman, a Sobibór survivor, described Bolender and his dog:

In fall 1942, Bolender became the commander of the Ukrainian camp guards at Sobibór. Moshe Bahir, a Sobibór survivor, wrote about Bolender:

In December 1942, Bolender's duties at Sobibór were temporarily put on hold when he was sent to prison for intimidating a witness involved in his divorce. After serving the sentence, Bolender returned to Operation Reinhard, where he assisted in the dismantlement and liquidation of Sobibor. Afterwards he served at the SS labor camp at Dorohucza and subsequently to Trieste in Italy. On 18 January 1945, Bolender was awarded the Iron Cross 2nd class. 

Arrest and trial and suicide
After World War II, Bolender assumed a fake identity, did not contact his family or his relatives, and after some time, had himself declared deceased. He was recognized in May 1961 working as a bouncer at a nightclub in Germany and was immediately arrested. He was arrested under an assumed name Heinz Brenner.  It is probable that after the war he also went by the pseudonym Wilhelm Kurt Vahle while working as a bouncer at the Er- und Siebar and the Hofbräuhaus'' in Hamburg.  At his residence police found a whip with the silver initials "KB", the inscription that was created at the camp by Sobibór survivor Stanisław Szmajzner.

In 1965, Bolender, along with 11 former SS guards from Sobibór, was tried in Hagen, West Germany. At the trial Bolender initially claimed that he had never been in Sobibór, but instead fought against partisans around Lublin, Poland. However, he broke down under cross-examination and confessed to being present at Sobibór. 

Prior to the completion of the trial, Kurt Bolender committed suicide by hanging himself in his prison cell. In his suicide note, he insisted that he was innocent.

See also
 List of people who died by suicide by hanging

References

1912 births
1966 suicides
Holocaust perpetrators in Poland
People from Duisburg
Aktion T4 personnel
Nazis who committed suicide in prison custody
Prisoners who died in German detention
Sobibor extermination camp personnel
Sobibor trial
SS non-commissioned officers
People from the Rhine Province
Nazis who committed suicide in Germany
Suicides by hanging in Germany
German people who died in prison custody